Glennys Young is a professor of history and the chair of the history department at the University of Washington. She also is a professor of Russian studies at the Henry M. Jackson School of International Studies and is affiliated with University of Washington's Comparative History of Ideas Department. From 2016 to 2019, she was the Jon Bridgman Endowed Professor in History. Her research focuses include Russia, the former Soviet Union, religion in the Soviet Union, Soviet foreign policy, Russian foreign relations, the Cold War, and twentieth-century Spain.

Early life and education
Young graduated from Nazareth Area High School in Nazareth, Pennsylvania in 1977. She attended Lafayette College, transferring to the University of Pennsylvania in 1981 and graduating summa cum laude with a bachelor's in history. In 1989, she earned her PhD in history from the University of California, Berkeley.

Career
In 1989, Young began her academic career as a visiting scholar at the Hoover Institution at Stanford University in Stanford, California. From 1990 to 1992, she worked as a lecturer at Stanford University before being hired as a professor at the University of Washington, where she received a dual appointment in the department of history and the Henry M. Jackson School of International Studies.

Selected publications 
 Young, Glennys. The Communist Experience in the Twentieth Century: A Global History through Sources. New York: Oxford University Press, 2011. Print.
 Young, Glennys. Power and the Sacred in Revolutionary Russia: Religious Activists in the Village. University Park, Pa.: Pennsylvania State University Press, 1997. Print.
 Young, Glennys. To Russia with 'Spain': Spanish Exiles in the USSR and the Longue Durée of Soviet History. Bloomington: Slavica Publishers, Indiana University. 2014. Print.

References 

Living people
University of Washington faculty
Stanford University faculty
University of Pennsylvania School of Arts and Sciences alumni
American historians
Year of birth missing (living people)
Nazareth Area High School alumni